Denis Badré (born 3 January 1943 in Pontarlier, Doubs) is a member of the Senate of France, representing the Hauts-de-Seine department. He is a member of the MoDem. He is the father of Bertrand Badré.

References

1943 births
Living people
People from Pontarlier
French Senators of the Fifth Republic
Democratic Movement (France) politicians
Recipients of the Order of the Cross of Terra Mariana, 3rd Class
Mayors of places in Île-de-France
École Polytechnique alumni
Union of Democrats and Independents politicians
Senators of Hauts-de-Seine